Disco is a 2012 Indian Telugu language comedy film directed by debutant Hari K. Chanduri and produced by Abhinav Reddy, under Style Entertainment. It stars Nikhil Siddharth and Sara Sharma. It was released on 20 April 2012.

Cast
 Nikhil Siddharth as Disco 
 Sara Sharmaa as Shiny
 Ashish Vidyarthi as Don
 M S Narayana as Surya Bhai
 Ali 
Raghu Babu
 Vijay Sai 
 Prudhviraj
 Vijay Sai 
 Subhashini 
 Vamsi Paidithalli

Production
This is the First film from Style Entertainment.

Filming
The film started its regular shooting on 24 June 2011 in Hyderabad. A schedule was started in the Pattaya, Thailand. The film unit shot a song on lead pair Nikhil and Sarah Sharma in Kerala schedule. Shooting completed in February 2012.

Soundtrack

Nikhil‘s Disco soundtrack was launched on 6 March at Hyderabad. The first CD was released by V. V. Vinayak and was presented to producer Bellamkonda Suresh. Music for the film scored by Anand of Manthra fame.

Release
The movie was given 'A' certificate. It was released on 20 April 2012.

Reception
The movie received negative reviews from critics. 123telugu gave a review stating 1.5/5 and stated that "Disco is a safely avoidable flick. Poor performances, bad direction and silly scenes will test the limits of your patience. The long run time and foolish narration only make things worse. Stay away from this movie unless you want to watch something that is embarrassingly bad". The Times of India gave rating 2/5 and stated "Nikhil is his energetic self but he really cannot pull a whole movie by himself, at least not this one. The characterization, screenplay, music all borders on the mindless".

References

External links
 

Indian action comedy films
2010s Telugu-language films
Films shot in Hyderabad, India
Films shot in Thailand
Films shot in Kerala
2012 action comedy films
2012 films
Disco films